The 2012 Southeastern Conference baseball tournament was held at Regions Park in Hoover, Alabama from May 22 through 27, 2012.

Seeding
The top ten teams (based on conference results) from the conference earned invites to the tournament.

Format
The 2012 tournament increased the number of teams from eight to ten. The event ran from Tuesday through Sunday. Regular season division champions received byes on Tuesday. Games played from Tuesday to Friday were double elimination. Saturday's games featured semifinal match-ups with no "if necessary" games, like in years past. Winners of the two semi-final games faced each other during Sunday's championship game.

Tournament

 * Game went to extra innings
 ^ Game ended after 7 innings because of mercy rule

All-Tournament Team

See also
 2012 College World Series
 2012 NCAA Division I baseball tournament
 Southeastern Conference baseball tournament

External links
SECSports.com
2012 Baseball Tournament

Tournament
Southeastern Conference Baseball Tournament
Southeastern Conference baseball tournament
Southeastern Conference baseball tournament
College sports tournaments in Alabama
Baseball competitions in Hoover, Alabama